Bettina Masuch (born 1964) is a German dramaturg and theatre director as well as artistic director at the Festspielhaus St. Pölten.

Life and work 
Born in Solingen, Masuch studied German language and literature, philosophy and applied theatre studies at the Justus Liebig University in Giessen. In 2002, she worked as a production dramaturge for the choreographer Meg Stuart at the Schauspielhaus Zürich. From 2003 to 2008, she worked as a dance curator for the Hebbel am Ufer theatre in Berlin. Until 2008, she was a member of the artistic direction of the dance festival Tanz im August in Berlin. From 2009 to 2013, Masuch directed the Springdance Festival in Utrecht.

Furthermore, she is the editor and author of specialist publications and has teaching assignments at international universities.

In 2022, Masuch will take over as artistic director at the Festspielhaus St. Pölten, succeeding  in this function.

Publications 
 Bühnen / Räume. Damit die Zeit nicht stehenbleibt. (as editor), Theater der Zeit, Berlin 2000. .
 Wohnfront 201–2002. (as editor), Alexander-Verlag, Berlin 2002. .

References 

Theatrologists
German theatre directors
Women theatre directors
1964 births
Living people
People from Solingen